Asamang is a village in the Atwima Nwabiagya district, a district in the Ashanti Region of Ghana.

References

Populated places in the Ashanti Region